The 1979 Equatorial Guinea coup d'état happened on August 3, 1979, when President Francisco Macías Nguema's nephew, Teodoro Obiang Nguema Mbasogo, overthrew him in a bloody coup. Fighting between loyalists and rebels continued until Macías Nguema was captured fleeing for Cameroon on August 18. He sentenced his uncle to death for the crime of genocide against the Bubi people and other crimes committed. Macías Nguema was executed by firing squad on September 29, 1979. Teodoro has remained President since then.

Background
After Francoist Spain granted Equatorial Guinea independence in 1968, a power struggle between Macías and Atanasio Ndongo Miyone led to the former assuming the presidency. Ndongo attempted a coup the following year; he was captured and executed, and the backlash to the presumed Spanish involvement in the coup led to a mass exodus of Spanish natives from the country. Macías subsequently consolidated national political authority, making himself the totalitarian dictator of the country. Macías' reign as dictator was marked by his extensive use of state violence against his political opponents, Nigerian migrant workers, and minority ethnic groups, particularly the Bubi people. An estimated 35,000-50,000 people died during Macías' time in power, many of them in mass killings or imprisonment in the country's notorious prison camps, and, by 1979, 25% of the country's population lived in exile.

The coup
In the summer of 1979, Macías ordered several members of his own family killed. This led Obiang and several other members of Macías' inner circle to fear that Macías was no longer acting rationally. Obiang was Macías' nephew, as well as the brother of one of the victims.

Obiang, who also served as deputy defense minister, overthrew his uncle on August 3, 1979. The coup was backed by the nation's military and Macías' Cuban palace guard; several foreign embassies, including those of Spain and the United States, were aware of the plot in advance and provided financial humanitarian aid in its aftermath. Upon his ouster, Macías and his personal bodyguard fled to Macías' home village of Nzeng-Ayong and took up residence in a fortified bunker protected by military loyalists. The ensuing conflict between Obiang and Macías' forces killed 400 people; it ended when Macías burned his personal treasury and fled toward the Cameroon border. A force led by naval commander Florencio Mayé captured Macías on August 18, and he and six of his allies were executed on September 29. Obiang has remained president of Equatorial Guinea since the coup.

See also
2004 Equatorial Guinea coup d'état attempt

Further reading 

 Geoffrey Jensen. 2019. "Tyranny, Communism, and U.S. Policy in Equatorial Guinea, 1968–1979." Diplomatic History.

References 

Coup
History of Equatorial Guinea
Wars involving Equatorial Guinea
Conflicts in 1979
1970s coups d'état and coup attempts
August 1979 events in Africa